Baltus (Balthus) Mantz (January 29, 1815 – August 9, 1854) was an American politician.

Mantz was a farmer, from Meeker, Wisconsin. He was born in Germany in 1815 and immigrated to the United States in 1837. Mantz served as register of deeds for Washington County, Wisconsin and in town government. He then served in the Wisconsin State Senate, in 1854, from Washington County, Wisconsin. He backed a plan to drain the lakes at Muskego, Wisconsin.

Mantz died of cholera on August 8 or August 9, 1854 while still in office.

Notes

References

1815 births
1854 deaths
People from Germantown, Wisconsin
County officials in Wisconsin
Wisconsin state senators
19th-century American politicians